John Gosnold (by 1507 – 1554), of Otley, Suffolk and London, was an English lawyer and politician. He was a Member of Parliament (MP) for Ipswich in 1547 and in October 1553.

Early life
John was the son of Robert Gosnold and Agnes daughter of Agnes, of John Hill.

Legal career
He trained as a lawyer being admitted to Gray's Inn in 1526 and was called to the bar in 1528.  In 1532 his legal services were engaged by Thomas Wentworth, 1st Baron Wentworth.

Family life
He married Katherine, the daughter of Sir Thomas Blennerhasset.

References

1554 deaths
People from Suffolk Coastal (district)
Politicians from Suffolk
Politicians from London
English MPs 1547–1552
English MPs 1553 (Mary I)
Members of the Parliament of England (pre-1707) for Ipswich
Year of birth uncertain